This is a list of Superfund sites in Alaska designated under the Comprehensive Environmental Response, Compensation, and Liability Act (CERCLA) environmental law.  The CERCLA federal law of 1980 authorized the United States Environmental Protection Agency (EPA) to create a list of polluted locations requiring a long-term response to clean up hazardous material contaminations.

These locations are known as Superfund sites, and are placed on the National Priorities List (NPL).  The NPL guides the EPA in "determining which sites warrant further investigation" for environmental remediation.  As of May 7, 2020 there were six Superfund sites on the National Priorities List in Alaska.  No additional sites are currently proposed for entry on the list.  Three sites have been cleaned up and removed from the list.

Superfund sites

Note:  There are also two NPL equivalent sites in the state of Alaska, which are not included in the table above.<ref></</ref>

See also
List of Superfund sites in the United States
List of environmental issues
List of waste types
TOXMAP

References

External links
 EPA list of proposed Superfund sites in Alaska
 EPA list of current Superfund sites in Alaska
 EPA list of Superfund site construction completions in Alaska
 EPA list of partially deleted Superfund sites in Alaska
 EPA list of deleted Superfund sites in Alaska

Superfund
Superfund
Alaska